The Crescent Range, sometimes referred to as the Randolph Mountains, is located in the White Mountains of New Hampshire in the United States.

Summits 
(from north to south)

 Black Crescent Mountain, 
 Mount Crescent, 
 Mount Randolph, 
 Boy Mountain,

See also
 White Mountains (New Hampshire)
 New England/Acadian forests

References

Landforms of Coös County, New Hampshire
Mountain ranges of New Hampshire